Camilo Echeverry (born 16 March 1994), known mononymously as Camilo, is a Colombian singer, musician and songwriter. He is known for his singles "Tutu", alongside Pedro Capó and Shakira, and "Desconocidos", with Mau y Ricky and Manuel Turizo. His music is generally categorized as Latin pop with a mix of urbano music and is noted for his romantic lyrics and soprano voice.

Debuted in 2008, after winning the talent show Factor XS in 2007. He is also known for writing and producing hits for other artists including Becky G and Natti Natasha's "Sin Pijama" and Bad Bunny's "Si Estuviésemos Juntos".

His accolades include five Latin Grammy Awards and two Grammy Award nominations.

Biography

1994–2022 Early life and career beginnings 
Camilo Echeverry was born in Medellín, Antioquia but raised in Montería, Córdoba. His family home did not have a radio, but housed a collection of records by artists such as The Beatles, Shakira, Charly Garcia, Facundo Cabral, Mercedes Sosa, and Pink Floyd. He recalled, "That was my first seed, since I was little, my dream was to inherit that." He formed a musical duo with his sister, Manuela, and auditioned for XS Factor with her, but the pair did not reach the final round of the competition. After winning the show as a solo artist the following year in 2007, Camilo began his career with the release of the single, "Regálame Tu Corazón".

In 2008, Camilo made appearances on Colombian telenovelas Super Pá and En los tacones de Eva, as well as the children's program Bichos. He released the 2010 mixtape Tráfico de Sentimientos and shortly after its release, Camilo decided to take a break from releasing his own music. In 2015, he moved to Miami, Florida, where he then furthered his career by writing songs for other artists, including "Sin Pijama" by Becky G and Natti Natasha, "Veneno" by Anitta, and "Ya No Tiene Novio" by Sebastian Yatra with Mau y Ricky. "Ya No Tiene Novio", released in August 2018, garnered over 517 million views on Youtube by March of the next year.

2018–present: Success as a solo artist 

Upon re-launching his solo career, Camilo made changes to his image. He eschewed his previously clean-cut style in favor of a more bohemian look, complete with a handlebar moustache. In 2018, he released the song "Desconocidos" with Manuel Turizo and Mau & Ricky. The ukulele-tinged reggaeton song peaked at number 23 on the Billboard Latin Pop Airplay chart. Following the success of "Desconocidos", Camilo revealed in February 2019 that he had signed with Sony Music Latin. On 22 February 2019, Camilo performed at the Venezuela Live Aid concert in Cúcuta, Colombia, a town located on the border with Venezuela. He reflected on the experience by explaining "It was a concert that moved me a lot. It was not easy, but so many people are suffering. I felt happy to be a part of raising global awareness to show what is happening in Venezuela is a tremendous injustice."

He released the video and single for "No Te Vayas" as his mainstream debut on 28 March 2019, and by August of that year, the video had reached more than 59 million views on Youtube. His 2019 song "La Boca" with Mau & Ricky was certified triple-platinum. After the release of the song, he made his US television debut, performing "La Boca" and "No Te Vayas" at the 2019 Premios Juventud in Miami. He released the song "Tutu" in collaboration with Puerto Rican singer Pedro Capó, which reached the number two position on the Latin Pop Airplay chart. Describing the lyrical content of the song, Camilo explained, “This song is who I am, what I feel every time I get on a stage or when I see my girlfriend.” Camilo released his first studio album Por Primera Vez on 17 April 2020, which debuted at number one on the Billboard Latin Pop Albums chart and number five on the Top Latin Albums chart. The album contains the singles "Tutu" and "Favorito".

In March 2021, he released his album Mis Manos which included some collaborations with artists such as Evaluna Montaner, Mau y Ricky, El Alfa, and Los Dos Carnales. His album is a candidate for Album Of The Year and Best Pop Vocal Album at the Latin Grammy Awards.

At the 21st Annual Latin Grammy Awards, Camilo received six nominations, winning the award for Best Pop Song for "Tutu".
Recently Selena Gomez and Camilo released a new song called "999".

Musical style 
Camilo's music is generally characterized as Latin pop and reggaeton. Suzette Fernandez of Billboard labeled his music as "romantic pop songs fused with urban beats". His vocals have been described as "distinctly delicate". He cites Uruguayan singer Jorge Drexler as a major influence on his work.

Personal life 
In February 2020, he married Evaluna Montaner, daughter of the Argentine-Venezuelan singer and songwriter Ricardo Montaner and sister of the Venezuelan duo Mau y Ricky, after five years of dating. They have one daughter, Índigo, born on April 6, 2022.

Discography 

 Por Primera Vez (2020)
 Mis Manos (2021)
 De Adentro Pa' Afuera (2022)

Filmography

Awards and nominations

References

External links 

 
 

1994 births
Colombian child singers
21st-century Colombian male singers
Colombian pop singers
Colombian reggaeton musicians
Latin Grammy Award winners
Living people
People from Medellín
Sony Music Latin artists
Latin music songwriters